Transcription factor Sp4 is a protein that in humans is encoded by the SP4 gene.

Interactions 

Sp4 transcription factor has been shown to interact with E2F1.

References

Further reading

External links 
 

Transcription factors